Nong Tom railway station is a railway station located in Wong Khong Subdistrict, Phrom Phiram District, Phitsanulok. It is located 423.203 km from Bangkok railway station and is a class 2 railway station. It is on the Northern Line of the State Railway of Thailand. Nong Tom Railway Station opened in November 1908 as part of the Northern Line extension from Phitsanulok to Ban Dara Junction.

Train services
 Special Express 3/4 Bangkok-Sawankhalok/Sila At-Bangkok
 Express 51 Bangkok-Chiang Mai
 Rapid 102 Chiang Mai-Bangkok
 Rapid 105/106 Bangkok-Sila At-Bangkok
 Rapid 107/108 Bangkok-Den Chai-Bangkok
 Rapid 109 Bangkok-Chiang Mai
 Rapid 111/112 Bangkok-Den Chai-Bangkok
 Local 403 Phitsanulok-Sila At
 Local 407/408 Nakhon Sawan-Chiang Mai-Nakhon Sawan
 Local 410 Sila At-Phitsanulok

References
 Ichirō, Kakizaki (2010). Ōkoku no tetsuro: tai tetsudō no rekishi. Kyōto: Kyōtodaigakugakujutsushuppankai. 
 Otohiro, Watanabe (2013). Tai kokutetsu yonsenkiro no tabi: shasō fūkei kanzen kiroku. Tōkyō: Bungeisha. 

Railway stations in Thailand